Pandit Sanjeev Abhyankar (born 1969) is a Hindustani classical music vocalist of the Mewati Gharana.
He won the National Film Award for Best Male Playback Singer in 1999 for his song, Suno Re Bhaila, in the Hindi film, Godmother and also the Kumar Gandharva National Award 2008 from the Govt of Madhya Pradesh for sustained excellence in the field of Classical Arts.

Early life
Sanjeev Abhyankar was born on 5 October 1969 in Pune, India to Shobha Abhyankar. He started learning Hindustani classical music at the age of eight, groomed by his mother and his guru Pimpalkhare and later from Pandit Jasraj.

Singing career
Abhyankar rendered his first stage performance in Mumbai at the age of 11 in 1981. Sanjeev has given vocal for Essence of Life, a dance group conceptualized by Dega Deva Kumar Reddy to spread Jiddu Krishnamurti's teachings across India.

Film discography
 Tum Gaye (with Lata Mangeshkar), Maachis [1996]
 Yeh Hai Shaan Banaras Ki, Banaras (2005)
 Lai Ja Re Badra, Dil Pe Mat Le Yaar (2000)
 Sada Sumiran Karle, Dashavatar (2008)
 Suno Re Suno Re Bhayina Ke, Godmother (1998)
 Rukhe Naina, Maqbool (2003)
 Tu Astis Tar, Coffee Ani Barach Kahi (2015)

References

External links
  Sanjeev Abhyankar Website
 

1969 births
Living people
Hindustani singers
Indian male playback singers
Mewati gharana
Singers from Pune
Marathi people
Marathi-language singers
Bhajan singers
Best Male Playback Singer National Film Award winners
20th-century Indian male singers
20th-century Indian singers
21st-century Indian male singers
21st-century Indian singers